The 2020 Turkish Women's Cup was the third edition of the Turkish Women's Cup, an invitational women's football tournament held annually in Turkey. It took place from 4 to 10 March 2020.

Teams

Venezuela withdrew before the tournament and was replaced with BIIK Kazygurt and Belarus.

Squads

Preliminary round
All times are local (UTC+3).

Group A

Group B

Goalscorers

References

Turkish Women's Cup
Turkish Women's Cup
Turkish Women's Cup
Turkish Women's Cup